Carlo Bacchiocco was an Italian painter, born in Milan. The volume Scelte Pitture di Brescia by Averoldo mentions several of his pictures in Brescia, particularly in the church of SS. Giacomo e Filippo and Santa Maria degl'Angeli.

References
 

17th-century Italian painters
Italian male painters
Painters from Milan
Painters from Brescia
Year of death unknown
Year of birth unknown